The Yamato Colony was an attempt to create a community of Japanese farmers in what is now Boca Raton, Florida, early in the 20th century. With encouragement from Florida authorities, young Japanese men were recruited to farm in the colony. There were as many as 75 Japanese men, some with their families, at the peak. There was "a cluster of two-story frame houses, a general store..., some packing houses."

Because of various difficulties, including blight, the colony never grew very large, and gradually declined until it was finally dispersed during World War II.

The Model Land Company was created by Henry Flagler to hold title to the land granted to his Florida East Coast Railway by the State of Florida. The company encouraged the settlement of its land, particularly by recent immigrants, to gain money from the sale of the land and to increase business for the railroad. In 1903, the company was referred to Jo Sakai, a Japanese man who had just graduated from New York University. Sakai purchased 1,000 acres (4 km) from the Model Land Company, and recruited young men from his hometown of Miyazu, Japan, to settle there. Several hundred settlers grew pineapples, which were shipped from the Yamato station on the Florida East Coast Railway. Pineapple blight destroyed the crop in 1908. In addition, the colony could no longer compete with cheaper (and earlier maturing) pineapples from Cuba. As a result, many of the settlers returned to Japan or moved elsewhere in the United States. The remnants of the colony were dispossessed after the entry of the United States into World War II, when their land was purchased to create a United States Army Air Corps training base (now the site of Florida Atlantic University and the Boca Raton Airport).

The only member of the Yamato Colony to stay in the area was George Morikami, who continued to farm in neighboring Delray Beach, Florida until the 1970s, when he donated his farmland to Palm Beach County to preserve it as a park, and to honor the memory of the Yamato Colony.

The Yamato Colony is remembered today in Yamato Road, a major street in Boca Raton, and in Morikami Park and the Morikami Museum and Japanese Gardens. Delray Beach is a sister city with Miyazu, in honor of George Morikami and the Yamato Colony.

See also
Yamato Colony, California

References

Bibliography

External links
History of Yamato Colony on the Morikami Museum web site URL retrieved April 5, 2006
Photo exhibit of the Yamato Colony, presented by the State Archives of Florida

Japanese-American culture in Florida
Boca Raton, Florida
Delray Beach, Florida
Former populated places in Florida
Japanese-American history
Populated places established in 1903
1903 establishments in Florida
Former populated places in Miami-Dade County, Florida
Populated places disestablished in 1942
1942 disestablishments in Florida